al Ashwal is a Yemenite Arabic surname. Notable people with the surname include:

 Ahmed Ali al-Ashwal (born 1949), Yemeni Army General
 Mohammed Al-Ashwal (born 1983), Yemeni Wushu martial artist

Arabic-language surnames